Teeter may refer to:

People
Karl V. Teeter, American linguist
Lara Teeter, American dancer, actor, singer, theatre director and college professor
Lawrence Teeter, American lawyer and attorney of Sirhan Sirhan
Mike Teeter, American football defensive lineman 
Robert Teeter, American Republican pollster and political campaign strategist

Other uses
Harris Teeter, supermarket chain
Teeter Plan, a law in California
Seesaw